Silvaroo is an extinct genus of megafaunal macropods that existed in Australia in the Pleistocene. Based on fossil evidence and affinities with the extant forest wallabies from the genera Dorcopsis and Dorcopsulus from Papua New Guinea, the two species of this genus were removed from the genus Protemnodon to Silvaroo.

References

Prehistoric macropods
Prehistoric mammals of Australia
Pleistocene marsupials
Prehistoric marsupial genera
Fossil taxa described in 2004